Petit-Palais-et-Cornemps is a commune in the Gironde department in Nouvelle-Aquitaine in southwestern France.

Population

Puisseguin road crash
Most of the forty-three dead of the Puisseguin road crash the 23 October 2015, passengers of a bus which hit a lorry, belonged to the Petit-Palais seniors' club. This accident was the deadliest road accident in France since 1982.

See also
 Communes of the Gironde department

References

Communes of Gironde